Richard "Dick" Levins (June 1, 1930 – January 19, 2016) was an ex-tropical farmer turned ecologist, a population geneticist, biomathematician, mathematical ecologist, and philosopher of science who researched diversity in human populations.  Until his death, Levins was a university professor at the Harvard T.H. Chan School of Public Health and a long-time political activist. He was best known for his work on evolution and complexity in changing environments and on metapopulations.

Levins also had written on philosophical issues in biology and modelling. One of his influential articles is "The Strategy of Model Building in Population Biology". He has influenced a number of contemporary philosophers of biology. Levins often boasted publicly that he was a 'fourth generation Marxist' and often had said that the methodology in his Evolution in Changing Environments was based upon the introduction to Marx's Grundrisse, the author's notes (not published until 1939) for Das Kapital. With the evolutionary geneticist Richard Lewontin, Levins had written a number of articles on methodology, philosophy, and social implications of biology. Many of these are collected in The Dialectical Biologist. In 2007, the duo published a second thematic collection of essays titled Biology Under the Influence: Dialectical Essays on Ecology, Agriculture, and Health.

Also with Lewontin, Levins had co-authored a number of satirical articles criticizing sociobiology, systems modeling in ecology, and other topics under the pseudonym Isadore Nabi. Levins and Lewontin managed to place a ridiculous biography of Nabi and his achievements in American Men of Science, thereby showing how little editorial care and fact-checking work went on in that respected reference work.

Biography
Richard Levins was of Ukrainian Jewish heritage and was born  on June 1, 1930, in Brooklyn, New York. He recorded reminiscences of his politically and scientifically precocious childhood in an article in Red Diapers. He reportedly had read Paul de Kruif's Microbe Hunters (1926) at age 8 (in 1938) and his first of Charles Darwin's books at age 12 (in 1942). At the age of 10, Levins had been inspired by the essays of the Marxist biological polymath J. B. S. Haldane, whom Levins considers to be the equal of Albert Einstein in scientific importance.

Levins studied agriculture and mathematics at Cornell. He married Puerto Rican writer Rosario Morales in 1950.  Blacklisted on his graduation from Cornell, he and Rosario moved to Puerto Rico, where they farmed and did rural organizing. They returned to New York in 1956, where he earned his PhD at Columbia University (awarded 1965). Levins taught at the University of Puerto Rico from 1961 to 1967 and was a prominent member of the Puerto Rican independence movement.  He visited Cuba for the first time in 1964, beginning a lifelong scientific and political collaboration with Cuban biologists. His active participation in the independence and anti-war movements in Puerto Rico led to his being denied tenure at the University of Puerto Rico, and in 1967 he and Rosario and their three children - Aurora, Ricardo, and Alejandro - moved to Chicago, where he taught at the University of Chicago and constantly interacted with Lewontin.  Both Richard and Rosario later moved to Harvard with the sponsorship of E. O. Wilson, with whom they had later disputes over sociobiology. Levins was elected member of the US National Academy of Sciences but resigned because of the Academy's role in advising the US military during the war. He had been a member of the US and Puerto Rican Communist Parties, the Movimiento Pro Independencia (the Independence movement in Puerto Rico), and the Puerto Rican Socialist Party, and he was on an FBI surveillance list.

Until his death, Levins was John Rock Professor of Population Sciences and head of the Human Ecology program in the Department of Global Health and Population of the Harvard School of Public Health. In the early 1990s, Levins and others formed the Harvard Working Group on New and Resurgent Diseases. Their work showed that alarming new infections had sprung from changes in the environment, either natural or caused by humans (Wilson et al. 1994).

During his final two decades, Levins had concentrated on application of ecology to agriculture, particularly in the economically less-well-developed nations of this planet.  As a member of the OXFAM-America Board of Directors and former chair of their subcommittee on Latin America and the Caribbean, Richard Levins worked from a critique of the industrial-commercial pathway of development and promoted alternative development pathways which focused attention upon (a) economic viability with (b) population equity, (c) ecological and social sustainability, and (d) empowerment of the dispossessed.

When his wife Rosario died in 2011, his daughter Aurora moved in with her father in his Cambridge, Massachusetts home.

One of Levins's grandchildren is Minneapolis-based hip hop artist Manny Phesto.

Levins died in Cambridge, Massachusetts, on January 19, 2016.

A species of lizard, Sphaerodactylus levinsi, is named in his honor.

Evolution in changing environments

Prior to Levins' work, population genetics had assumed the environment to be constant, while mathematical ecology assumed the genetic makeup of the species involved to be constant. Levins modelled the situation in which evolution is taking place while the environment changes. One of the surprising consequences of his model is that selection need not maximize adaptation, and that species can select themselves to extinction. He encapsulated his major early results in Evolution in Changing Environments, a book based on lectures he delivered in Cuba in the early 1960s. Levins made extensive use of mathematics, some of which he invented himself, although it had been previously developed in other areas of pure mathematics or economics without his awareness of it. For instance, Levins makes extensive use of convex set theory for fitness sets, (resembling the economic formulations of J. R. Hicks) and extends Sewall Wright's path analysis to the analysis of causal feedback loops.

Metapopulation theory

The term metapopulation was coined by Levins in 1969 to describe a "population of populations". Populations inhabit a landscape of suitable habitat patches, each capable of hosting a local sub-population. Local populations may become extinct and be subsequently recolonized by immigration from patches; the fate of such a system of local populations (i.e., the metapopulation) depends on the balance between extinctions and colonizations. Levins introduced a model consisting of a single differential equation, nowadays known as the Levins model, to describe the dynamics of average patch occupancy in such systems. Metapopulation theory has since become an important area of spatial ecology, with applications in conservation biology, population management, and pest control.

Quotations
 "The world is stranger than we can imagine and surprises are inevitable in science. Thus we found, for example, that pesticides increase pests, antibiotics can create pathogens, agricultural development creates hunger, and flood control leads to flooding.  But some of these surprises could have been avoided if the problems had been posed big enough to accommodate solutions in the context of the whole."   -  Dr. Richard Levins

Awards

 Edinburgh Medal in Science and Society
 Lukács 21st Century Award (for his contributions to mathematical ecology)
 Numerous awards in Puerto Rico and Cuba (for contributions to ecology and agriculture; most recently, the 30th Anniversary Medal of the Cuban Academy of Sciences)
 Robert Wood Johnson Foundation 'Investigator Awards in Health Policy Research', 1995
 Honorary Doctorate in Environmental Science from the University of Havana, 1999
 Honorary Master of Philosophy in Human Ecology from College of the Atlantic, 2012
 American Public Health Association's 2007 Milton Terris Global Health Award: Lecture: "One Foot in, One Foot out"
 "The Truth is the Whole: A Symposium in Celebration of the Unity and Dynamic Complexity of Life" was a Festschrift in Honor of Richard Levins for his 85th birthday at Harvard T.H. Chan School of Public Health, May 21–23, 2015.  Essays, tributes, and reminiscences based on the symposium were published in 2018.

Selected bibliography

Levins, R. "Genetic Consequences of Natural Selection," in Talbot Waterman and Harold Morowitz, eds., Theoretical and Mathematical Biology, Yale, 1965, pp. 372–387.

Levins, R. Evolution in Changing Environments, Princeton University Press, 1968.
Levins, R. "Some demographic and genetic consequences of environmental heterogeneity for biological control", Bulletin of the Entomological Society of America, 15:237–240, 1969.
Levins, R. "Extinction", in M. Gerstenhaver, Editor. Some Mathematical Problems in Biology. American Mathematical Society, Providence, RI, Pages 77–104.  In this historic paper, Levins coined the term 'metapopulation' (now widely used).
Levins, R. "Evolution in communities near equilibrium", in M. L. Cody and J.M. Diamond (eds) Ecology and Evolution of Communities, Harvard University Press, 1975.
Nabi, I., (pseud.) "An Evolutionary Interpretation of the English Sonnet: First Annual Piltdown Man Lecture on Man and Society," Science and Nature, no. 3, 1980, 71-73.
Levinsin, R., Haila, Y.  Marxilaisena biologinen Yhdysvalloissa. Richard Levinsin haastattelu [Yrjö Haila]. Tiede & edistys 8(1):29-37 (1983).
Levins, R. and R.C. Lewontin,  The Dialectical Biologist, Harvard University Press, 1985.
Puccia, C.J. and Levins, R. Qualitative Modeling of Complex Systems: An Introduction to Loop Analysis and Time Averaging, Harvard University Press, Cambridge, MA. 1986.
Levins, R. and Vandermeer, J. "The agroecosystem embedded in a complex ecological community" in: Carroll R.C., Vandermeer J. and Rosset P., eds., Agroecology, New York: Wiley and Sons, 1990.
Haila, Y., and Levins, R. Humanity and Nature, London: Pluto Press, 1992.

Awerbuch T.E. Evolution of mathematical models of epidemics. In: Wilson, Levins, and Spielman (eds).Disease in Evolution. New York Academy of Sciences, New York 1994, 225-231.
 Wilson, M., Levins, R., and Spielman, A. (eds). Disease in Evolution. New York Academy of Sciences, New York 1994

Awerbuch T.E., Brinkman, U., Eckardt, I., Epstein, P., Ford, T., Levins, R., Makhaoul, N., Possas, C.A., Puccia, C., Spielman, A., and Wilson, M., Globalization, development, and the spread of disease. In: Goldsmith and Mander (eds.) The Case Against the Global Economy, Sierra Club Books, 1996, 160–170.
Levins, R. "Touch Red," in Judy Kaplan and Linn Shapiro, eds., Red Diapers: Growing up in the Communist Left, U. of Illinois,  1998, pp. 257–266.

Awerbuch T., Kiszewski A., and Levins, R., Surprise, Nonlinearity and Complex Behavior. In– Health Impacts of Global Environmental Change: Concepts and Methods; Martens and Mcmichael (eds), 96-102, 2002

Awerbuch, T.E., Gonzalez, C., Hernandez, D., Sibat, R., Tapia, J.L., Levins, R., and Sandberg S., The natural control of the scale insect Lepidosaphes gloverii on Cuban citrus. Inter American Citrus Network newsletter No21/22, July 2004.

Lewontin, R.C. and Levins, R., "Biology Under The Influence, Dialectical Essays on Ecology, Agriculture, and Health," New York: Monthly Review Press, 2007.

Awerbuch T., and Levins, R. Mathematical Models for Health Policy. in Mathematical Models, [Eds. Jerzy A. Filar, and Jacek B. Krawczyk], in Encyclopedia of Life Support Systems (EOLSS), Developed under the Auspices of the UNESCO, Eolss Publishers, Oxford, UK, 2006
Predescu, M., Sirbu, R., Levins, R., and Awerbuch T., On the Dynamics of a Deterministic and Stochastic Model for Mosquito Control. Applied Mathematics Letters, 20, 919-925, 2007.
Awerbuch, T.E., Levins, R., The Aging Heart and the Loss of Complexity—a Difference Equation Model. Preliminary report. American Mathematical Society, (1056-39-2059), presented at AMS Convention, San Francisco, California, January 13, 2010
Levins, R., Una pierna adentro, una pierna afuera. CopIt ArXives & EditoraC3, Mexico. SC0005ES. , 2015
Levins, R., Scientific Method for Today’s Market, The Mathematical Intelligencer, 37 (1), 47-47, 2015 (March 1).

See also

 Alan Gross
 Aurora Levins Morales
 Cristina Possas
 Cuba
 Dialectic
 Eco-socialism
 Ecosocial theory
 Florida Current
 Florida Straits
 Gregory Bateson
 Gulf of Mexico
 Gulf Stream
 Isadore Nabi
 Looking Backward
 Loop Current
 Marxism
 Mesh analysis
 Metapopulation
 Milton Terris
 Ocean current
 Population dynamics
 Richard Lewontin
 Tamara Awerbuch-Friedlander
 Theses on Feuerbach
 Yucatán Peninsula

References

External links
 Personal Website of Prof. Richard Levins, PhD
 Harvard webpage 
 In "Living the 11th Thesis" Richard Levins discusses his own biography
 Personal narrative of political activity in Puerto Rico
 Robert Wood Johnson Foundation 'Investigator Awards in Health Policy Research' page on Richard Levins 
 Finding truth in ‘the whole’, Amy Roeder, October 15, 2015, Featured News Stories, Harvard T.H. Chan website, accessed 10/16/2015 - Includes a good current photo of Dr. Levins
 Dialectics of disease: Richard Levins, Harvard Public Health Review, 75th Anniversary Issue, Volume II, 1985-1997, pp. 16-18, accessed 10/16/2015
 Google Scholar Citations for Dr. Richard Levins

1930 births
2016 deaths
American biologists
American people of Ukrainian-Jewish descent
American agronomists
Cornell University alumni
Columbia University alumni
Mathematical ecologists
Natural scientists
University of Puerto Rico faculty
University of Chicago faculty
Harvard School of Public Health faculty
Harvard University faculty
Jewish American scientists
American Marxists
American Marxist writers
Marxist theorists
Human ecologists
American activists
Public health researchers
20th-century naturalists
American naturalists
American philosophers
American expatriates in Cuba